Cegielnia may refer to the following places:
Cegielnia, Kuyavian-Pomeranian Voivodeship (north-central Poland)
Cegielnia, Hrubieszów County in Lublin Voivodeship (east Poland)
Cegielnia, Janów Lubelski County in Lublin Voivodeship (east Poland)
Cegielnia, Białystok County in Podlaskie Voivodeship (north-east Poland)
Cegielnia, Lubartów County in Lublin Voivodeship (east Poland)
Cegielnia, Lublin County in Lublin Voivodeship (east Poland)
Cegielnia, Świętokrzyskie Voivodeship (south-central Poland)
Cegielnia, Grójec County in Masovian Voivodeship (east-central Poland)
Cegielnia, Płock County in Masovian Voivodeship (east-central Poland)
Cegielnia, Przasnysz County in Masovian Voivodeship (east-central Poland)
Cegielnia, Wołomin County in Masovian Voivodeship (east-central Poland)
Cegielnia, Gmina Kleczew in Greater Poland Voivodeship (west-central Poland)
Cegielnia, Gmina Wilczyn in Greater Poland Voivodeship (west-central Poland)
Cegielnia, Krotoszyn County in Greater Poland Voivodeship (west-central Poland)
Cegielnia, Silesian Voivodeship (south Poland)
Cegielnia, Chojnice County in Pomeranian Voivodeship (north Poland)
Cegielnia, Wejherowo County in Pomeranian Voivodeship (north Poland)
Cegielnia, Warmian-Masurian Voivodeship (north Poland)